Live at Roadburn 2008 may refer to:

 Live at Roadburn 2008 (Wolves in the Throne Room album)
 Live at Roadburn 2008 (Year of No Light album)